Podbukovje is a former village in eastern Slovenia in the Municipality of Trebnje. It is now part of the village of Arčelca. It is part of the traditional region of Lower Carniola and is now included in the Southeast Slovenia Statistical Region.

Geography
Podbukovje is located northwest of the village center of Arčelca. It is connected by a side road to Orlaka to the west. Birch Peak rises above the settlement to the southwest.

History
Podbukovje was annexed by Arčelca in 1953, ending its existence as a separate settlement.

References

External links
Podbukovje on Geopedia

Populated places in the Municipality of Trebnje
Former settlements in Slovenia